The 2012 Okayama GT 300km was the first round of the 2012 Super GT season. It took place on April 1, 2012.

Race results

Okayama GT 300km